Gyrodon is a genus of pored mushroom bearing close affinity to the genus Paxillus. Recent molecular research has confirmed this relationship of the two genera as sister taxa, together diverging as one of the most basal lineages in the Boletineae, and sister to the Boletaceae.

Gyrodon was circumscribed by German botanist Wilhelm Opatowski in 1836.

Species
, Index Fungorum lists 13 species of Gyrodon.

See also
Boletinellus merulioides

References

Paxillaceae
Boletales genera